Zamzam Mohamed is a Kenyan politician from the Orange Democratic Movement.

Political career 
Mohamed was elected women's representative in the National Assembly from Mombasa County in the 2022 general election.

References 

Place of birth missing (living people)
Year of birth missing (living people)
Living people
Kenyan women representatives
People from Mombasa County
21st-century Kenyan women politicians
21st-century Kenyan politicians
Members of the 13th Parliament of Kenya
Orange Democratic Movement politicians